Scelodonta vicina is a species of leaf beetle of the Democratic Republic of the Congo, Saudi Arabia and Yemen, described by the German entomologist Edgar von Harold in 1877.

References

Eumolpinae
Beetles of the Democratic Republic of the Congo
Beetles described in 1877
Taxa named by Edgar von Harold